Akoba is a village in the Batman District of Batman Province in Turkey. The village had a population of 738 in 2021.

The hamlet of Demirköy is attached to the village.

References 

Villages in Batman District
Kurdish settlements in Batman Province